Bazaria djiroftella is a species of snout moth in the genus Bazaria. It was described by Hans Georg Amsel in 1959. It was described from Persia.

References

Phycitini
Moths described in 1959
Moths of Asia